Pablo Gabriel García Pérez (born 11 May 1977) is a Uruguayan former professional footballer who played as a defensive midfielder, currently manager of Super League Greece 2 club PAOK B.

A player of physical approach to the game (which earned him a reputation for being a dirty player), his nickname is Canario (canary), referring to his birthplace. He spent most of his professional career in La Liga, amassing 135 appearances in six years in representation of four teams, but also played several seasons in Greece with PAOK.

A Uruguayan international over one decade, García appeared for the nation at the 2002 World Cup and two Copa América tournaments.

Club career

Early career
Born in Pando, Canelones Department, García started his career in Montevideo Wanderers FC. After a six-month spell at Peñarol he was transferred to Atlético Madrid but, however, would never make it past their reserves, being transferred to Italian giants A.C. Milan two years later.

After just five Serie A appearances during the 2000–01 season, García was loaned to fellow league club Venezia A.C. in January 2002. In spite of their relegation, he had overall good performances.

Spain
Moving to CA Osasuna for the 2002–03 campaign, García played intense football throughout three seasons in Navarre. In his first match, a 2–2 La Liga draw at Villarreal CF on 1 September 2002, he collected a booking and scored the match's final goal.

In the final of the 2005 Copa del Rey García, already an essential midfield element for Osasuna, received a straight red card after a dangerous challenge on Real Betis' Joaquín, in an eventual 2–1 extra time loss. However, he had already caught the eye of Real Madrid which signed the player to a three-year contract, with compatriot Carlos Diogo also being purchased.

After having received 17 yellow (season-most) and one red cards during 2004–05 (the Cup final notwithstanding), García made his Real Madrid official debut on 10 September 2005, playing 11 minutes in a 2–3 home defeat to RC Celta de Vigo. Eventually, he won the battle for the team's first-choice holding midfielder over Thomas Gravesen, although none were an undisputed starter.

After helping Madrid to a runner-up place in the 2005–06 season, García was deemed surplus to requirements by new boss Fabio Capello and, on 29 August 2006, he signed a one-year loan contract with Celta. After an uneventful personal campaign where he was injured for most of the year and his club was also relegated, he returned to Real Madrid in July 2007 to be loaned immediately again, this time to newly promoted Real Murcia.

PAOK

After another relegation, García was released by Real Madrid on 10 July 2008 and, on the 23rd, agreed to join PAOK FC in Greece. He quickly became a fan favorite, not as much for his defensive abilities rather than his hot temper; managing to receive three red cards in his first six games, and also starring in an infamous incident with Olympiacos F.C. player Diogo during a derby. After being hit in the face by Diogo's elbow in a confrontation during a set piece, García retaliated with a punch to the Brazilian's belly; both actions surprisingly eluded the referee's attention, but the Uruguayan eventually received a three-match ban.

García's second season was much better overall, as PAOK only conceded 16 goals in 30 matches, finishing second in the table, with him forming a stable midfield partnership with Spaniard Vitolo. On 21 February 2010 he scored in a 2–1 home win over against Panathinaikos FC, shortening the gap to that opposition to two points. Additionally, he renewed his link to the club until 2012, even agreeing to a reduction in his salary in line with the club's stagnant finances.

On 23 May 2012, it was announced that the 35-year-old García renewed his contract for one more year. On 20 March of the following year, he was mutually released from contract after several incidents with coach Giorgos Donis.

García returned to PAOK on 4 June 2013 at the request of major shareholder Ivan Savvidis, agreeing to a one-year deal. In the following winter transfer window, however, he left for fellow league side Skoda Xanthi FC, retiring after a couple of months at the age of 37 and settling in Thessaloniki.

On 24 May 2015, García returned to PAOK in an unspecified position. The following month, the club's sporting director Frank Arnesen announced that the former would start his managerial career as an assistant in the under-17 team.

García was undefeated for 78 matches during his spell at the helm of the under-19 side, winning two national championships in the process. On 30 October 2020, he was appointed coach of the main squad following the dismissal of Abel Ferreira. The following 22 May, he won the domestic cup with a 2–1 victory against league winners Olympiacos in the final; he was fired shortly after, however, being offered a position at the reserves.

International career
A full Uruguayan international since 13 December 1997, in a King Fahd Cup match against United Arab Emirates, García quickly developed into a mainstay for the national team, going on to earn a total of 66 caps. He played all 270 minutes in the country's participation in the 2002 FIFA World Cup, but was not able to help qualify for the 2006 edition after losing a penalty shootout to Australia on 16 November 2005.

García scored a powerful finesse shot from outside the box against Venezuela in the 2007 Copa América quarter-finals, but also missed a decisive penalty against Brazil in the next round.

Managerial statistics

Honours

Player
Osasuna
Copa del Rey runner-up: 2004–05

International
FIFA U-20 World Cup runner-up: 1997
Copa América runner-up: 1999

Individual
PAOK MVP of the Season: 2011–12

Manager
PAOK
Greek Football Cup: 2020–21

Notes

References

External links

Stats at Lega Serie A 
Stats at Superleague Greece
National team data 

1977 births
Living people
People from Pando, Uruguay
Uruguayan people of Spanish descent
Uruguayan footballers
Association football midfielders
Uruguayan Primera División players
Montevideo Wanderers F.C. players
Peñarol players
La Liga players
Segunda División players
Atlético Madrid B players
Real Valladolid players
Atlético Madrid footballers
CA Osasuna players
Real Madrid CF players
RC Celta de Vigo players
Real Murcia players
Serie A players
A.C. Milan players
Venezia F.C. players
Super League Greece players
PAOK FC players
Xanthi F.C. players
Uruguay under-20 international footballers
Uruguay international footballers
1997 FIFA Confederations Cup players
1999 Copa América players
2002 FIFA World Cup players
2007 Copa América players
Uruguayan expatriate footballers
Expatriate footballers in Spain
Expatriate footballers in Italy
Expatriate footballers in Greece
Uruguayan expatriate sportspeople in Spain
Uruguayan expatriate sportspeople in Italy
Uruguayan expatriate sportspeople in Greece
Uruguayan football managers
Super League Greece managers
PAOK FC managers
Uruguayan expatriate football managers
Expatriate football managers in Greece
PAOK FC non-playing staff